Claudia Hiersche (born 22 February 1977 in Frankfurt (Oder), German Democratic Republic (now Federal Republic of Germany)) is a German host and actress and is well known for her portrayal of the lesbian fictional character Carla von Lahnstein in the soap opera Verbotene Liebe (Forbidden Love), where she was on contract status between 2003 and 2009.

She attended a drama school in Manhattan for three months. Before her work on Verbotene Liebe, she was the host of the travel magazine television show Wolkenlos from 2000 to 2002. In 2003, Claudia also starred in the movie Schwer verknallt as a character, once again, named Carla.

As for her character in Verbotene Liebe she became very popular when her character Carla had a relationship with Hanna Novak. In 2006, Carla was the second lesbian character on German soap opera to marry another woman. (The first was Billi Vogt, who married her girlfriend Andrea on German soap opera Marienhof in 2002.)

Personal life
Claudia had to abruptly leave within 24 hours to West Germany, due to her father wanting to start an independent newspaper.

Filmography

References

External links
 

Living people
German television actresses
1977 births
People from Frankfurt (Oder)
German soap opera actresses